Tūreiti Te Heuheu Tūkino V ( – 1 June 1921) was a notable New Zealand tribal leader and politician. Of Māori descent, he identified with the Ngāti Tūwharetoa iwi, and was the son of Te Heuheu Tūkino IV. He was born in Waihi, New Zealand in about 1865. He was appointed to the Legislative Council on 7 May 1918. He served until his death.

References

1865 births
1921 deaths
Members of the New Zealand Legislative Council
Ngāti Tūwharetoa people
Māori politicians
Māori MLCs
Unsuccessful candidates in the 1893 New Zealand general election
Unsuccessful candidates in the 1899 New Zealand general election
Unsuccessful candidates in the 1902 New Zealand general election
Unsuccessful candidates in the 1905 New Zealand general election
Unsuccessful candidates in the 1908 New Zealand general election
19th-century New Zealand politicians
Te Heuheu family